Teratura is a genus of Asian bush crickets belonging to the tribe Meconematini (subfamily Meconematinae).  Species have been recorded from India, Indo-China, China and Peninsular Malaysia.

Species 
The Orthoptera Species File lists the following:
 Teratura albidisca Sänger & Helfert, 1998
 Teratura angusi Gorochov, 1998
 Teratura cincta (Bey-Bienko, 1962)
 Teratura darevskyi Gorochov, 1993(synonym T. flexispatha Qiu & Shi, 2010)
 Teratura hastata Shi, Mao & Ou, 2007
 Teratura lyra Gorochov, 2001
 Teratura maculata Ingrisch, 1990
 Teratura monstrosa Redtenbacher, 1891 – type species, locality: Carin-Ghecü, Myanmar
 Teratura paracincta Gorochov & Kang, 2005
 Teratura pulchella Gorochov & Kang, 2005

Note: 
 Two subgenera, Macroteratura and Stenoteratura are now placed in genus Macroteratura Gorochov, 1993;
 Subgenus Megaconema has now been elevated to the monotypic genus containing  Megaconema geniculata (Bey-Bienko, 1962) from China.

References

External links

Meconematinae
Tettigoniidae genera
Orthoptera of Asia